William Haigh Robinson (22 January 1919 – 2 September 2007) was an Australian rules footballer who played with Hawthorn in the Victorian Football League (VFL).

After initially serving in the army reserve, Robinson transferred to the Royal Australian Air Force in 1941, serving as an equipment assistant after unsuccessfully applying to become a pilot.

In 1950 he was seriously injured in a car accident that left him with permanent vision loss.

Notes

External links 

1919 births
2007 deaths
Australian rules footballers from Victoria (Australia)
Hawthorn Football Club players
Royal Australian Air Force personnel of World War II